North  Kosovo, also known as the Ibar Kolašin (or Kollashini i Ibrit; earlier Old Kolašin, ;  or Kollashini i Vjetër), is a region in the northern part of Kosovo, generally understood as a group of four municipalities with ethnic Kosovo Serbs majority: North Mitrovica, Leposavić, Zvečan and Zubin Potok.

Prior to the 2013 Brussels Agreement, the region functioned independently from the institutions in Kosovo, as they refused to acknowledge and recognize the independence of Kosovo, declared in 2008. The Government of Kosovo opposed any kind of parallel government for Serbs in this region. However, the parallel structures were all abolished by the Brussels Agreement, signed between the governments of Kosovo and Serbia. Both governments agreed upon creating a Community of Serb Municipalities. The association was expected to be officially formed in 2016. According to the agreement, its assembly will have no legislative authority and the judicial authorities will be integrated and operate within the Kosovo legal framework. Political wrangling over Kosovo's status between its government and Serbia and has resulted in Kosovan authorities not allowing the formation of the Community. However differences remain and North Kosovo remains under de facto Serbian rule.

History

2008–2013: Assembly of the Serb municipalities
Following Kosovo's declaration of independence in 2008, Serbs put together the Assembly of the Community of Municipalities, elected on 11 May and called by the Government of Serbia. The assembly was composed by 45 representatives. The North Kosovo Serbs had taken a consistently hard line, refusing to cooperate with the government in Pristina or to take up their seats in the Assembly of Kosovo. Their stance was encouraged by the Serbian government of Vojislav Koštunica and they remained in control of this area with their own structures.

Srpska Lista (Serbian List) leader Oliver Ivanović and other Kosovo Serb leaders had expressed increasing frustration at Belgrade's approach and have voiced their support for a more moderate stance, speaking openly of rejoining the Assembly of Kosovo and taking part in its government. This line has proved highly controversial, as many Kosovo Serbs reject any compromise; in February 2004, Ivanović's car was destroyed by a bomb explosion outside his home in Mitrovica. The Serbian government, the Serbian List, the Government of Kosovo and the United Nations all officially oppose the separation of North Kosovo. However, many Serbs in the region were adamantly opposed to living under the rule of an Albanian-majority provincial government and rejected an independent Kosovo. Ivanović has spoken out against partition, pointing out that more than 60,000 (50%) of the Serb population of Kosovo lives south of the Ibar, and that all of the important cultural and economic assets of the Kosovo Serbs are in the south of Kosovo.

In 2011, former President of Kosovo Behgjet Pacolli crossed into the Northern part of Mitrovica. It marked the first time that a high ranking Republic of Kosovo official visited Northern Kosovo. Such a symbolic gesture was accompanied by a heavy security presence.

2013–today: Brussels Agreement

In early 2013, the Prime Minister of Serbia Ivica Dačić encouraged all Serbs to participate in Kosovo elections. The vast majority of Serbs turned out in large numbers to participate in elections held by the Kosovo government with symbols of the Republic of Kosovo Central Elections Commission on the ballot.

With the signatory of the Brussels Agreement, Serbia officially dropped its support for the assembly and the parallel structures in Northern Kosovo. Both governments, of Kosovo and Serbia agreed upon creating the Community of Serb Municipalities. According to the agreement, its assembly will have no legislative authority and the judicial authorities will be integrated and operate within the Kosovo legal framework. There will be one police force in Kosovo called the Kosovo Police. All police in northern Kosovo shall be integrated into the Kosovo Police framework. Salaries will solely be paid by the KP. The Appellate Court in Pristina will establish a panel composed of a majority of Kosovo Serbs judges to deal with all Kosovo Serb majority municipalities.

As the final stage of dialogue between Serbia and Kosovo is approaching, various officials from Serbia have stated that the partition of Kosovo, with Serbia getting North Kosovo, is the best solution. President of Serbia Aleksandar Vučić said on 9 August that he is for the division of Kosovo. The same could be heard from Minister of Foreign Affairs Ivica Dačić and Defense Minister Aleksandar Vulin. Some Albanian politicians stated that the exchange of territories may be the solution of the Serbia-Kosovo dispute (with Serbia annexing North Kosovo and the Republic of Kosovo annexing Preševo Valley), although many others rejected this proposal.

Demographics

North Kosovo consists of four municipalities, Leposavić, Zvečan, Zubin Potok and North Mitrovica. It covers 1,007 km² (389 sq. mi.), or 9.97% of Kosovo's land area. Owing to its border with Serbia proper, North Kosovo is not, strictly speaking, a "Serb enclave" or "Serb exclave".

Before the Kosovo War, the area was predominantly inhabited by Serbs, with a substantial Kosovo Albanians minority and smaller populations of Bosniaks and Roma. The 1991 census recorded 50,500 people in the municipalities of Leposavić, Zvečan and Zubin Potok, of whom the vast majority were Serbs, with a small number of Albanians, and other smaller minorities, though the Statistical Office of Kosovo regards the accuracy of this census as "questionable" given that most Albanians boycotted it. The population of the Mitrovica municipality was predominantly Albanian, with the town itself and two of the nearby villages being ethnically mixed.

Mitrovica was split between Serbs and Albanians at the end of the war, with the Ibar River marking the dividing line. North Mitrovica, which is now home to approximately 22,500 Serbs and 7,000 members of other ethnic groups, is recognized since 2013 as a separate municipality by the Government of Kosovo.

In 2018, the Organization for Security and Co-operation in Europe estimated that the population of Leposavić, Zvečan, Zubin Potok and North Mitrovica stands at 48,500 inhabitants. Of these, around 42,500 (87%) are Serbs, 5,000 (10%) Albanians, 1,000 (3%) Bosniaks and others.

These estimations indicate that more than 60% of all Kosovo's Serbs live in North Kosovo. A special bus service operates in parts of North Kosovo to facilitate the movement of non-Serb residents around the territory. The bus operates with an accompanying security presence to ensure the safety of the passengers and permits those residents to more safely enter and leave the North Kosovo area.

Municipalities

Economy

The economy of the region was devastated by the war — by 2006, the unemployment rate had reached 77% in Mitrovica municipality. The largest employer was the Trepča mining complex in Zvečan which employed 4,000 people at the height of its operations. However, it was shut down in August 2000 due to the severe pollution which it was producing. The economic situation has deteriorated significantly in recent years due to a lack of capital investment, exacerbated by the uncertainty caused by the political dispute over the region's future. The region uses the Serbian dinar rather than the euro used elsewhere in Kosovo. Smuggling of goods such as alcohol has become a business in North Kosovo where the customs regulations of the Kosovo authorities are unable to be enforced. The Kosovo customs authorities do, however, attempt to curtail the flow of illegal goods from North Kosovo into the rest of Kosovo and have an elaborate network of surveillance cameras in place in that regard. Smugglers transport goods over the porous frontier between Central Serbia and North Kosovo.

Many residents of North Kosovo have not paid for electricity since the Kosovo War. As a result, the energy-intensive industry of cryptomining, especially of Bitcoin, is especially profitable. The electricity used is estimated to cost about 12 million euros annually.

Geography

North Kosovo is rich in mineral resources, once known for the Trepča mining complex. In the northern part of the region north Kosovo, there is a ridge of the mountain Kopaonik, with the peak of Šatorica, above of the town Leposavić. The southern boundary is the river Ibar, which divides the towns of Mitrovica and North Mitrovica. On the west by Zubin Potok, the mountain ranges of Rogozna and Mokra Gora with the peak of Berim, which separates one from the other lake Gazivode.

Politics and the rule of law

Politics
Since 1999, the north of Kosovo, which had a majority of Serb inhabitants, had been governed as de facto independent from the Albanian-dominated government in Pristina. It used Serbian national symbols and participated in Serbian national elections, which are boycotted in the rest of Kosovo; and in turn, it boycotted Kosovo's elections. The municipalities of Leposavić, Zvečan and Zubin Potok are run by local Serbs, while the Mitrovica municipality had rival Serb and Albanian governments until a compromise was agreed in November 2002, whereby the city has one mayor. Serbs were active participants in the Kosovo Elections of 2013.

The region united into a community, the Union of Serbian Districts and District Units of Kosovo and Metohija established in February 2008 by Serbian delegates meeting in Mitrovica, which has since served as North Kosovo's capital. The Union's President is Dragan Velić. This union is not recognised by the Republic of Kosovo, or by UNMIK. And was abolished in 2013 as a result of the Brussels Agreement.

There is also a central governing body, the Serbian National Council for Kosovo and Metohija (SNV). The President of the SNV in North Kosovo is Dr. Milan Ivanović, while the head of its Executive Council is Rada Trajković. Local politics are dominated by the Serbian List for Kosovo. The Serbian List was led by Oliver Ivanović, an engineer from Mitrovica.

North Kosovo is by far the largest of the Serb-dominated areas within Kosovo, and unlike the others, directly borders Central Serbia. This had facilitated its ability to govern itself almost completely independently of the Kosovo institutions in a de facto state of partition; the authorities in turn chose to observe Belgrade's direct rule, which was generally recognised as the legal authority over Kosovo as a whole until the 1998–1999 Kosovo War. However, despite the region being contiguous with Central Serbia, its location within Kosovo and the subsequent conditions of the Kumanovo Treaty in 1999 mean that UNMIK officials have freedom of movement in North Kosovo whereby they assume supervisory status whilst no institution (e.g. police) is in place to enforce Serbian central directives which apply to the rest of Serbia. Before the 2008 Kosovo declaration of independence, it had been speculated that Kosovo might be partitioned with North Kosovo remaining part of Serbia. The complexity of the region has been on the agenda of the 2011 Pristina-Belgrade Talks. In November 2012, Prime Minister of Kosovo Hashim Thaçi stated that autonomy for Northern Kosovo will never be granted, and the region will always remain a part of the Republic of Kosovo.

Rule of law
Law enforcement and green border checkpoints are carried out by KFOR, EULEX and Kosovo Police. According to an International Crisis Group report, covert agents of Serbian police also operate in the area. North Mitrovica in particular remains a hot spot for organized crime.

Sport
Due to Serbian refusal of Kosovo institutions, Serbs in this part of Kosovo act independently in sport. For example, the Football First League of North Kosovo is primarily formed of Serbian clubs from four of North Kosovo's municipalities.

Gallery

Notable people
Isa Boletini - Kosovo Albanian nationalist figure and guerrilla fighter
Rexhep Mitrovica - Albanian politician, 20th Prime Minister of Albania 
Milan Biševac - football player
Miloš Krasić - football player
Nikola Lazetić - football player
Stevan Stojanović - former football player; won the European Cup in 1991 with Red Star Belgrade.
Nevena Božović - Serbian singer, Eurovision Song Contest participant
Anđelka Tomašević - Miss Universe Serbia 2014

See also
 2021 North Kosovo crisis
 2011–13 North Kosovo crisis
 Community of Serb Municipalities
 Hypothetical Partition of Kosovo

Notes

References

Further reading
 Lutovac, M. (1956) Ibarski Kolašin. Naselja, Beograd, XXXIV, 8

External links

 Kosovo section at International Crisis Group
 Serbia-Kosovo Relations
 International Crisis Group. NORTH KOSOVO: DUAL SOVEREIGNTY IN PRACTICE, Europe Report N°211 – 14 March 2011
 Postcard from Mitrovica: Almost Mellow at Kosovo's Front-Line Cafe, TIME Magazine, 2008-06-04, Andrew Purvis

 
Disputed territories in Europe
Independence of Kosovo
Regions of Kosovo